Drawn Together is an American adult animated sitcom created by Dave Jeser and Matt Silverstein for Comedy Central. It premiered on October 27, 2004. The series is a parody of The Surreal Life and follows the misadventures of the housemates in the fictional show of the same name and uses a sitcom format with a reality TV show setting.

The show's main characters are a combination of personalities that were recognizable and familiar prior to the series. Differently, however, Drawn Together used caricatures of established cartoon characters and stock characters. In addition, their character traits parody personality types that are typically seen in reality TV shows.

Comedy Central advertised it as the first animated reality TV series, and in some episodes, the characters participate in challenges that are similar to reality TV challenges, although the premise is largely dropped in later episodes.

After three seasons, the show was cancelled. Subsequently, a direct-to-video film and series finale, The Drawn Together Movie: The Movie! was released on April 20, 2010.

Cast and characters

Captain Leslie Hero (voiced by Jess Harnell): A sociopathic, chauvinistic, idiotic, perverted, anti-heroic, bisexual, necrophilic and lecherous parody of superheroes, with a visual style taken from the cartoons of Bruce Timm and Max Fleischer. Being primarily macho, he is prone to occasional random fits of hysterics akin to post-traumatic stress disorder, playing on the "tragic origin" stories of many superheroes. His character is based on Superman, Mr. Majestic, Hyperion, Omni-Man, Shazam, and Samaritan. 
Wooldoor Jebediah Sockbat (voiced by James Arnold Taylor): A hyperactive, idiotic, gullible  bizarre children's show character in the mold of SpongeBob SquarePants or Stimpson J. "Stimpy" Cat who displays many of the typical reality-defying behaviors of Roger Rabbit or Looney Tunes characters.
Princess Clara (voiced by Tara Strong): A pampered, religious and bigoted princess who is a spoof of Disney princesses such as Ariel from The Little Mermaid (1989) and Belle from Beauty and the Beast (1991). She is homophobic, passionate about singing, and usually wears a lavender dress and white pearl earrings.
Foxxy Love (voiced by Cree Summer): A sharp-tongued ghetto-spoof of Valerie Brown from Hanna-Barbera's Josie and the Pussycats, she is a promiscuous mystery-solving musician.
Toot Braunstein (voiced by Tara Strong): A fat, egotistical and alcoholic retro-style sex symbol who is a parody of Betty Boop. Toot demands to be the center of attention, cuts herself with razor blades, practices poor personal hygiene and eats excessively when depressed and often instigates conflict in the house.
Xandir P. Wifflebottom (voiced by Jack Plotnick): A hypersensitive, homosexual and effeminate spoof of JRPG heroes like Link from The Legend of Zelda series, Cloud Strife from Final Fantasy VII, and Wonder Boy.
Spanky Ham (voiced by Adam Carolla): A sex-obsessed, toilet-humored, obnoxious anthropomorphic pig and a parody of various Internet Flash cartoon characters specifically from Newgrounds and Adult Swim, his likenesses were inspired by The Real World: San Francisco cast member David "Puck" Rainey.
Ling-Ling (voiced by Abbey McBride): A psychopathic, homicidal anime character who is heavily based on Pikachu from the Pokémon franchise and Tailmon from the Digimon franchise. He battles using various supernatural powers/abilities (represented in anime-like style) and speaks in pseudo-Japanese gibberish (or "Japorean", a portmanteau of "Japanese" and "Korean," as Ling-Ling's voice Abbey McBride calls it) with English subtitles.

Production

Animation style
 
The show's visual style is that of digital ink-and-paint. The style was chosen both for the retro feel it gives the show and for the versatility and freedom it allows the animators, providing an environment in which it is possible to combine many different styles of animation. Another unique aspect of the show is that, where most cartoons present their characters, though animated, as real within the show's world, the Drawn Together characters retain their identities as cartoon characters even within their animated world, and they acknowledge their status as animations. The show has cameo appearances by famous characters (or in some cases, clones to avoid infringing copyright) from all across the animated spectrum. In keeping with the various animation styles for the characters, Wooldoor and Toot have four fingers on each hand, whereas Clara, Foxxy, Hero and Xandir have five. In promotional artwork for the show, Toot and Wooldoor are drawn with the standard five fingers, but in the show itself they have four. Whereas most of the characters are drawn with black outlines, Clara and items belonging to her are drawn with soft edges, a reference to Disney animation techniques, which involve "cleanup" of any black outlines. Contrasting, Toot is drawn in the grainy, high-contrast monochrome of her era's technology.

The show was made by Rough Draft Studios in Glendale, California, with much of the animation done at the studio's facilities in South Korea. A gag in "The Drawn Together Clip Show" is that they show a list of all the Korean children who died animating the show.

The movie was produced by 6 Point Harness and done completely with Flash animation due to budget cuts.

Cancellation
A total of three seasons were produced. Season 3 began airing on October 5, 2006, and took a mid-season break which started on November 15, 2006. The second half of season three began airing on October 4, 2007.
In March 2007, it was announced that creators Dave Jeser and Matt Silverstein had left Comedy Central, and later created DJ & the Fro for their sister channel MTV in 2009, and eventually signed a two-year contract with 20th Century Fox Television to create new series and/or work on the studio's existing shows.

The season three finale included multiple jokes about the show's cancellation. TV Guide listed this episode as a series finale and described the episode as follows: "The series wraps up with the housemates participating in a singing competition as they look back on their recent misadventures."

In March 2008, Tara Strong confirmed that the show had been cancelled, and the back of the third season DVDs box refers to it as the "third and final season".

Since cancellation, the show has partial rotation late-nights, and airs uncensored on Comedy Central's Secret Stash and on Logo.

Despite the cancellation, the official page of Drawn Together in Myspace had suggested the fans call Comedy Central and convince them to make a new season.

Content

The plots and humor of Drawn Together are adult-oriented and laden with shock comedy. The humor is largely morbid and satirical in nature, its primary focus being the mockery of stereotypes and the casual exploration of taboo subject matter, such as masturbation, paraphilia, kinky sex, homosexuality or gay marriage, abortion, rape, incest, pedophilia, menstruation, spousal abuse, racism, homophobia, xenophobia, antisemitism, necrophilia, terrorism, graphic violence and death. Episodes such as "Gay Bash" or "A Very Special Drawn Together Afterschool Special", for example, feature the exploration of homosexuality as a central theme. Nearly all episodes feature at least one death, and several episodes feature characters going on killing sprees or perpetrating or becoming victims of mass murder, though the main characters subsequently returned alive and uninjured. The show breaks the fourth wall regularly; on one occasion, the show mocks Adam Carolla, the voice of Spanky Ham.

Despite the show's overt and underlined sexuality, the characters' innocent and sensual sides are often the main driving force of the plot (alongside comedic non-sequitur moments intended to parody standard plot lines). This adds romantic comedy, melodrama, action film, war film, court drama and other genres to the pool of spoofing material. Sincere feelings the characters are forced to experience (and comic disregard thereof) seem to add integrity to the plot and imbue every episode with a genuine moral message, made more efficient by constant spoofing of moral message clichés like "character X has learned a valuable lesson".

Comedy Central's original tagline for the show was "Find out what happens when cartoon characters stop being polite... and start making out in hot tubs", referring to Clara and Foxxy's kiss in the pilot episode. The line is a parody of The Real World's tagline, "Find out what happens when people stop being polite... and start getting real." The aforementioned hot tub kiss is considered one of the show's defining images; Comedy Central based nearly all of its first-season promotional material for Drawn Together on it.  In The Drawn Together Movie: The Movie!, a billboard featuring the hot tub kiss is a major plot point in the film and is the main reason why the Network Head is hunting the housemates down in order to kill them in the movie, due to the billboard being the cause of his wife and daughter's death.

The extensive use of stereotypes is another controversial aspect of the show, though the intent is actually to make fun of bigotry. As Jess Harnell states in the DVD commentary for "Hot Tub", "Most of the racism on the show is coming from people who are so obviously stupid about it; it really isn't that threatening". (Jewish people are mocked, including creators and principal cast member Tara Strong.) Other content known to be featured on some episodes are occurrences of natural disasters, depictions of dictators and sexual fetishes.

Drawn Together is heavy with popular culture references. Animation is a major source of material; as mentioned above, many characters from comics and animated cartoons make cameo appearances and often are the subjects of parody. However, numerous live-action films, TV shows, and video games are referenced as well. Reality shows are another prime inspiration, not surprising given that Drawn Together is presented as a reality show that takes place in a cartoon world. However, although many of the first-season plots made extensive use of the reality show scenario, this aspect of the show has largely been de-emphasized in later episodes. The spoofing of film and television clichés is another common theme on the show; many Drawn Together stories are parodies of overused plots from TV and films.

One notable factor of the series are musical numbers. Some are parodies of real songs (i.e. in "Hot Tub", the song "Black Chick's Tongue" is a parody of "A Whole New World" from Aladdin; in the episode "Super Nanny", the song at the DMV is a riff on "Who's That Guy?" from Grease 2; in "Freaks & Greeks", the song at the end is a take on "Summer Nights" from Grease; and "You'll Really Love Being Abandoned Here" in "Alzheimer's That Ends Well" is a reference to "I Think I'm Gonna Like It Here" from Annie). Other songs are those written by the show's creators/writers, like "The Bully Song" from "Requiem for a Reality Show" and "La-La-La-La-Labia" in "Clara's Dirty Little Secret"). Only two episodes ("Lost in Parking Space, Part One" and "Nipple Ring-Ring Goes to Foster Care") do not feature a musical performance.

In terms of continuity, events in different episodes contradict each other, as there is a loose sense of canon. One such example is in "The Other Cousin" and "N.R.A.y RAY", in which Toot is pictured with a penis, something that is not consistent with other episodes. Another is Foxxy's various and contradictory stories about her son Timmy (one involves selling him on the black market, another involves her accidentally shooting him after believing him to be rabid, when he was really just brushing his teeth). Plots and gags are often used that do not make any type of internal sense, but are used as one-off jokes, as when Foxxy, who is in her twenties, is said to have a teenage grandson. Some episodes begin with a fake recap of events supposed to have happened in a (non-existent) previous episode. According to executive producer Bill Freiberger, "Very little on Drawn Together can be considered canon. If you try to find continuity on this show you'll drive yourself nuts. The only thing that's consistent is we try to make the show as funny as possible. And we'd never let a little thing like continuity get in the way of that."

Occasionally, episodes of Drawn Together are shown with less editing for content during Secret Stash, a Comedy Central program aired on weekends at 1am that showcases films (i.e. Not Another Teen Movie), comedy specials (Comedy Central Roast), and animated programs (this and South Park) with uncensored language. Though Secret Stash programs typically have the nudity still censored, Drawn Together is an exception to this. Some nudity not seen in the original broadcast is shown in the Secret Stash version, while the nudity in other scenes is censored with a caption reading "DVD only"; this is done as a way of promoting the show's DVD releases.

Voice cast
Drawn Together features a mix of veteran voice actors (Tara Strong, Cree Summer, Jess Harnell, Adam Carolla and James Arnold Taylor) and newcomers to the field (Abbey McBride and Jack Plotnick).

Three of the show's voice actors had worked with creators Dave Jeser and Matt Silverstein on other projects: Jack Plotnick on Action, and Adam Carolla and Abbey McBride on The Man Show. Two of Drawn Together's guest stars also came from the casts of earlier Jeser/Silverstein projects: "The Other Cousin" guest star Sarah Silverman (from Greg the Bunny), and Carolla's Man Show co-host Jimmy Kimmel, who guest-starred in "Xandir and Tim, Sitting in a Tree" and "Alzheimer's That Ends Well".

Principal cast member Tara Strong has stated that she deeply loves the show, as it was such a departure from the family-friendly productions that she was used to working on at the time. The only problems that she had with it were a few jokes related to Anne Frank.

Originally, Xandir was to have been played by Nat Faxon, but he was fired following the first table read because the network felt his portrayal of the character was too stereotypically gay. Actor Jack Plotnick ended up being cast because he could play a gay man without resorting to stereotypical mannerisms such as the gay lisp.

In addition to their regular roles, the show's cast provides many of the minor roles and guest voices on the series, Summer, Strong, Harnell and Taylor in particular. In the DVD commentary for "Hot Tub", Tara Strong jokes that this is because the show does not have a lot of money to pay guest stars. Chris Edgerly appears in the majority of Season One and Two episodes despite not having a regular role on the series.

Critical reception
The pilot episode, "Hot Tub", was given mediocre reviews, which focused mostly on its crudity. USA Today deemed Drawn Together "the smutty offspring of Real World and Superfriends", stating that the pilot pushed the limits of taste, being overpowered by violence, sex, and disgusting subject matter. According to The New York Times, "Hot Tub", while it had many good sight gags, did not go far enough in parodying reality television. The domination of Clara's racism in the story was criticized as being a weak attempt to "send up racism while still showcasing its cruel excitement". Toot's cutting was praised as a good parody of self-harm presented on reality shows, but Spanky's flatulence was considered more disgusting than humorous.

The pilot episode was given an F rating from Entertainment Weekly, leading to the second-season episode "Xandir and Tim, Sitting in a Tree" having a subplot in which the majority of the housemates seek revenge for the rating. The latter episode also received an F from the magazine. Some reviewers called Drawn Together a "bizarre and highly entertaining series" which has a unique style of humor and "level of self-parody."

TV Guide named Drawn Together in its 60 Greatest Cartoons of All Time list in 2013.

Episodes

Distribution

Syndication and streaming
The series previously aired on Logo TV with episodes uncensored.

In May 2019, the series began streaming on the Viacom owned streaming platform, Pluto TV on the Comedy Central Pluto TV channel. The entire series was added to CBS All Access's (now Paramount+) roster in July 2020 among other Paramount Global properties.

Home releases
Season releases

The first season of Drawn Together was released on DVD by Paramount Home Entertainment on October 4, 2005. Its release was timed to coincide to be the same month as the premiere of Season Two on television on October 19, 2005. The set includes all seven aired first-season episodes. (By the time the release was finalized, it had been determined that the unaired "Terms of Endearment" would air during Season Two, so it was left off the set and eventually released as part of the Season Two set.) The profanity and nudity are intact and uncensored. Some shows also contain additional lines and scenes. Special features include audio commentary on select episodes by creators Dave Jeser and Matt Silverstein along with assorted cast and crew members, in addition to deleted scenes and karaoke/sing-along versions of the show's songs.

The set has a game called the Censored/Uncensored game: A line is given, and the viewer must decide if the line aired on television as given (uncensored), or if it had to be altered significantly or deleted (censored). Some of the censored lines appear intact in the extended DVD version of the episode. Getting at least 11 of the 19 questions correct unlocks a hidden feature, a prank phone call by Jeser and Silverstein to their agent regarding the royalties they are to receive for the DVD audio commentaries.

The song "Time of My Life" from "Dirty Pranking No. 2" had to be left off the first season DVD because of copyright concerns. The show mocked the situation in the lyrics of the replacement music.

Season Two Uncensored was released on September 25, 2007. Like the Season One set, the set features audio commentaries by Jeser and Silverstein along with assorted cast and crew members, as well as karaoke/singalong versions of the show's songs. The set also contains, in the words of the box art, "potentially annoying" commentary on the commentary for "Terms of Endearment". The behind-the-scenes interviews in the set are the same ones that appear on Comedy Central's website, which feature each of the voice actors talking about his or her character, along with a separate interview with creators Jeser and Silverstein. Tara Strong does two separate interviews, one for each of her characters (Princess Clara and Toot Braunstein).

The set includes the controversial horse shot from "Terms of Endearment", which was not allowed to air on television.

Season Three Uncensored was released on May 13, 2008.

The censored broadcast cuts of the episodes have never been made available on DVD or any other physical media, but they are available on Amazon.com's streaming service, with the original music.

Broadcast
In Indonesia, Aired on Nickelodeon Yay! (Formerly Kidszone) in 2005.

See also

The Joe Schmo Show, "A reality show that's not real"
Total Drama, a Canadian animated TV series that parodies reality television.
Panty & Stocking with Garterbelt, a Japanese animation with many styling cues of American animation and inspired by Drawn Together.
Saturday Morning All Star Hits!
Robot Chicken
Clone High

References

External links

 
 

Drawn Together
2000s American adult animated television series
2000s American sitcoms
2000s American LGBT-related animated television series
2000s American LGBT-related comedy television series
2000s American reality television series
2000s American satirical television series
2000s LGBT-related reality television series
2000s LGBT-related sitcoms
2004 American television series debuts
2007 American television series endings
American adult animated comedy television series
American adult animated musical television series
American animated sitcoms
Animated adult television sitcoms
American television series with live action and animation
English-language television shows
Comedy Central animated television series
Metafictional television series
Reality television series parodies
Animated satirical television series
Television censorship in the United States
Television series by Rough Draft Studios
Television series created by Dave Jeser
Television series created by Matt Silverstein
Television shows adapted into films